Macedonica is a genus of gastropods belonging to the family Clausiliidae.

The species of this genus are found in the Balkans.

Species:

Macedonica brabeneci 
Macedonica dobrostanica 
Macedonica frauenfeldi 
Macedonica guicciardii 
Macedonica hartmuti 
Macedonica macedonica 
Macedonica marginata 
Macedonica martae 
Macedonica pindica 
Macedonica pinteri 
Macedonica pirinensis 
Macedonica pirotana 
Macedonica schatzmayri 
Macedonica slavica 
Macedonica teodorae 
Macedonica thasia 
Macedonica ypsilon 
Macedonica zilchi

References

Clausiliidae